Cylichna zealandica is a species of sea snail or bubble snail, a marine opisthobranch gastropod mollusk in the family Cylichnidae, the chalice bubble snails or canoe bubble snails.

Description
The height of the shell is 9 mm, its diameter 3.8 mm. The white, strong shell is smooth and faintly longitudinally striated. The aperture is produced above the spire.

Distribution
This marine species is endemic to New Zealand and occurs off North Island at a depth of 60 m.

References

 Powell A. W. B., New Zealand Mollusca, William Collins Publishers Ltd, Auckland, New Zealand 1979 
 Spencer H.G., Willan R.C., Marshall B.A. & Murray T.J. (2011) Checklist of the Recent Mollusca Recorded from the New Zealand Exclusive Economic Zone

Cylichnidae
Gastropods of New Zealand
Gastropods described in 1880